The 1982–83 season was Aston Villa's 83rd season in the Football League. Tony Barton was manager after Ron Saunders had resigned in the previous season.

Villa qualified for the European Cup as holders and reaching the quarter-finals, and also won the European Super Cup in a two-legged contest with FC Barcelona of Spain. They finished the season sixth in the league.

First Division

League table

European Super Cup

European Cup

Aston Villa played in 1982–83 European Cup as champions. The club reached the quarter-finals but lost to eventual runners-up Juventus of Italy.

First round

Second round

Quarter-final

References

 

Aston Villa F.C. seasons